Selva Casal (11 January 1927 – 27 November 2020) was a Uruguayan poet.

Life
She was born in Montevideo. Her father Julio J. Casal was also a poet and the founder of a noted literary magazine Alfar. Her debut collection Arpa appeared in 1958. She published more than a dozen collections and won numerous prizes for her poetry.

Works
 Biografía de un arcángel (Estuario editora, 2012)
 En este lugar maravilloso vive la tristeza (Estuario editora, 2011)
 El grito (Editorial Artefato, 2005)
 Vivir es peligroso (Libros de Tierra Firme, 2001, Buenos Aires; Premio del Ministerio de Cultura)
 Perdidos manuscritos de la noche (Carlos Marchest Editor, 1996; Premio del Ministerio de Cultura)
 Hombre mutilado (inédito, 1988; Mención Honorífica Internacional. Concurso de Poesía Plural México)
 Los misiles apuntan a mi corazón (Ediciones de la Banda Oriental, 1988)
 Mi padre Julio J. Casal (ensayo lírico documental) (Biblioteca Alfar, 1987) [Dibujos de Barradas]
 Nadie ninguna soy (Biblioteca Alfar, 1983; 1º Premio de la Fundación Argentina para la Poesía, 1º Premio Municipal de Poesía en Uruguay)
 No vivimos en vano (Biblioteca Alfar, 1975)
 Han asesinado al viento (Editorial Alfa, 1971)
 Poemas 65 (Cuadernos Julio Herrera y Reissig, 1965 – Trad. al inglés Poetry review de la University of Tampa, 1966 – USA)
 Poemas de las cuatro de la tarde (Biblioteca Alfar, 1962 – Premio Municipal de Poesía)
 Días sobre la tierra (Cuadernos Julio Herrera y Reissig, 1960 – Melón editora, 2013, Buenos Aires)
 Arpa (Colección Delmira, 1958 – Premio del Ministerio de Instrucción Pública, 1954)

Anthologies and compilations
 Ningún día es jueves (Ediciones de Hermes Criollo, 2007)
 El infierno es una casa azul y otros poemas (Libros de Tierra Firme, 1999, Buenos Aires)
 El infierno es una casa azul (Ediciones de Uno, 1993; Premio del Ministerio de Cultura)

References

20th-century Uruguayan poets
Writers from Montevideo
1927 births
2020 deaths
Uruguayan women poets
20th-century Uruguayan women writers
21st-century Uruguayan poets
21st-century Uruguayan women writers